Windsor Forest and Great Park is a  biological Site of Special Scientific Interest in Berkshire and Surrey, located south of Windsor. It is a Special Area of Conservation and Windsor Forest is a Nature Conservation Review site, Grade I. Landscaped woodland gardens are Grade I listed on the Register of Historic Parks and Gardens of Special Historic Interest.

This large site has woodland with many ancient trees and large areas of parkland. It is second only to the New Forest for the diversity of its invertebrates, including many Red Data Book beetles and flies. There is an internationally important population of the violet click beetle. The fungi species are very diverse, including some which are extremely rare.

References

Sites of Special Scientific Interest in Surrey
Sites of Special Scientific Interest in Berkshire